Chandler Regional Airport  is a city-owned, public-use airport located three nautical miles (6 km) northeast of the central business district of Chandler, a city in Lincoln County, Oklahoma, United States. It is included in the National Plan of Integrated Airport Systems for 2011–2015, which categorized it as a general aviation facility.

Although most U.S. airports use the same three-letter location identifier for the FAA and IATA, this airport is assigned CQB by the FAA, but has no designation from the IATA.

Facilities and aircraft 
Chandler Regional Airport covers an area of 80 acres (32 ha) at an elevation of 984 feet (300 m) above mean sea level. It has one runway designated 17/35 with an asphalt surface measuring 4,000 by 60 feet (1,219 x 18 m).

For the 12-month period ending March 23, 2011, the airport had 3,400 general aviation aircraft operations, an average of 283 per month. At that time there were 5 aircraft based at this airport: 40% single-engine, 40% jet, and 20% multi-engine.

References

External links 
 Chandler Regional Airport at City of Chandler website
 Chandler Regional Airport (CQB) at Oklahoma Aeronautics Commission
 Aerial image as of February 1995 from USGS The National Map
 

Airports in Oklahoma
Buildings and structures in Lincoln County, Oklahoma